Nyandomsky (masculine), Nyandomskaya (feminine), or Nyandomskoye (neuter) may refer to:
Nyandomsky District, a district of Arkhangelsk Oblast, Russia
Nyandomskoye Urban Settlement, a municipal formation which the town of Nyandoma and eighteen rural localities in Nyandomsky District of Arkhangelsk Oblast, Russia are incorporated as
Nyandoma Okrug (Nyandomsky okrug, 1929–1930), an administrative division of Northern Krai of the Russian SFSR in the Soviet Union